Manuel Mark (born 10 November 1985) is an Austrian taekwondo athlete.

External links
 The-Sports.org

1985 births
Living people
Austrian male taekwondo practitioners
European Taekwondo Championships medalists
21st-century Austrian people